Eugenin is a chromone derivative, a phenolic compound found in cloves. It is also one of the compounds responsible for bitterness in carrots.

Derivatives 
  6-Hydroxymethyleugenin can be isolated from the fungal species Chaetomium minutum.

References 

Chromones
Bitter compounds
Phenol ethers
Phenols